The Jamberoo Superoos are an Australian rugby league football team based in Jamberoo, a country town of the Illawarra region. The club is a part of Country Rugby League and have competed in the South Coast first grade competition since its inception in 1914.

History
The Jamberoo Superoos started life like many other clubs in the area as a Rugby Union team, with players deciding to make the switch in 1913. Eight local clubs created the first South Coast tournament in 1914 of which Jamberoo was apart. The Superoos first ever game was against Kangaroo Valley on 30 May 1914. Jamberoo won the game 3-0. The following year the side won the first of their eight premierships before the tournament's hiatus due to World War I. They won their next premiership in 1927 and in doing so played in the first ever championship between the premiers of the Illawarra and South Coast competitions. The Superoos defeated Port Kembla 15-11 and thus were hailed the best team of the region. Jamberoo won two more premiership (1931 and 1932) in the middle of the newly merged Kiama-Bombo premierships of 1930 and 1933. The Superoos wouldn't win another premiership until 1951. The last premiership they won was in 1974.

The all mighty club went through some tough periods out of first grade. They made a short-lived comeback in 1988 and 1989 before departing first grade competition for almost twenty years.

Return to First Grade (2009-)
The Jamberoo Superoos returned to Group 7 Rugby League First Grade in 2008 with the intention of being competitive after making the grand final and semi-final in 2007 and 2008 in Reserve Grade. The club attracted some experienced players from other teams to combine with local youngsters. Now, many years on, the club is moving along nicely. With strong financial backing, and a first grade squad littered with young talent. The club is undoubtedly on the rise, and is starting to cement itself as a group 7 powerhouse with the likes of Gerringong and Shellharbour after winning the Grand Final in 2017.
The 2021 year looked like being their best year since returning to First Grade being undefeated in 7 games, scoring a total of 264 points and only conceding 48, by far the best defensive record in Group 7. A few games were postponed due to bad weather and the Covid outbreak and the Group 7 season was abandoned altogether in early July due to the pandemic robbing Jamberoo the chance to play against their nemesis Gerringong Lions who had only been defeated once in the season. Jamberoo Superoos are looking to continue their rise in the upcoming seasons.

Colours
The team's colours are green, red and black and wear a strip similar to that of NRL club the South Sydney Rabbitohs.

Honours

Team
 Group 7 Rugby League Premierships: 9
 1915, 1927, 1931, 1932, 1951, 1958, 1961, 1974, 2017
 Group 7 Rugby League Runners-Up: 10
 1920, 1926, 1938, 1939, 1946, 1947, 1950, 1954, 1956, 2019
 Ladies League Tag: 3
 2016, 2019, 2020
 Group 7 Second Grade Premierships: 5
 1925, 1946, 1947, 1969, 2022
 First Grade Minor Premierships: 6
 1931, 1939, 1951, 1954, 1961, 2017
 Third Grade Premierships (Regan Cup): 7
 1972, 1992, 1993, 1994, 1996, 1997, 2001
 U-18's Premierships: 
 None
 CRL Clayton Cup: 
 None

Source:

References

External links
 Jamberoo Superoos Homepage
 Country Rugby League Homepage
 Country Rugby League
 South Coast Rugby League Homepage

Rugby clubs established in 1913
1913 establishments in Australia
Rugby league teams in New South Wales
South Coast (New South Wales)
Jamberoo, New South Wales